The canton of Pontoise is an administrative division of the Val-d'Oise department, Île-de-France region, northern France. Its borders were modified at the French canton reorganisation which came into effect in March 2015. Its seat is in Pontoise.

It consists of the following communes:

Ableiges
Arronville
Le Bellay-en-Vexin
Berville
Boissy-l'Aillerie
Bréançon
Brignancourt
Chars
Commeny
Cormeilles-en-Vexin
Courcelles-sur-Viosne
Ennery
Épiais-Rhus
Frémécourt
Génicourt
Gouzangrez
Grisy-les-Plâtres
Haravilliers
Le Heaulme
Livilliers
Marines
Menouville
Montgeroult
Moussy
Neuilly-en-Vexin
Nucourt
Le Perchay
Pontoise
Santeuil
Theuville
Us
Vallangoujard

References

Cantons of Val-d'Oise